Saint-Michel-de-Montaigne is a commune in the Dordogne department in Nouvelle-Aquitaine in southwestern France.

The Château de Montaigne, where philosopher Michel de Montaigne lived in the 16th century, is situated in the commune.

Population

See also
Communes of the Dordogne department

References

Communes of Dordogne